This page lists all described genera and species of the spider family Sparassidae. , the World Spider Catalog accepts 1383 species in 96 genera:

 † Sparassidae sp. Wunderlich, 2008c — Palaeogen Baltic amber

A

Adcatomus

Adcatomus Karsch, 1880 - Sparassinae
 Adcatomus ciudadus Karsch, 1880 (type) — Venezuela, Peru
 Adcatomus flavovittatus (Simon, 1897) — Venezuela

Anaptomecus

Anaptomecus Simon, 1903 - Incertae Sedis
 Anaptomecus levyi Jäger, Rheims & Labarque, 2009 — Colombia
 Anaptomecus longiventris Simon, 1903 (type) — Costa Rica, Panama, Ecuador
 Anaptomecus paru Guala, Labarque & Rheims, 2012 — Colombia, Ecuador
 Anaptomecus suni Guala, Labarque & Rheims, 2012 — Ecuador
 Anaptomecus temii Jäger, Rheims & Labarque, 2009 — Panama
 Anaptomecus yarigui Galvis & Rheims, 2018 — Colombia

Anchonastus

Anchonastus Simon, 1898 - Palystinae
 Anchonastus caudatus Simon, 1898 (type) — Cameroon
 Anchonastus gertschi Lessert, 1946 — Congo
 Anchonastus pilipodus (Strand, 1913) — Central Africa
 Anchonastus plumosus (Pocock, 1900) — West Africa

Arandisa

Arandisa Lawrence, 1938 - Incertae Sedis
 Arandisa deserticola Lawrence, 1938 (type) — Namibia

B

Barylestis

Barylestis Simon, 1910 - Heteropodinae
 Barylestis blaisei (Simon, 1903) (type) — Gabon
 Barylestis fagei (Lessert, 1929) — Congo, Rwanda
 Barylestis insularis Simon, 1910 — Equatorial Guinea (Bioko)
 Barylestis manni (Strand, 1906) — Nigeria
 Barylestis montandoni (Lessert, 1929) — Congo, Uganda
 Barylestis nigripectus Simon, 1910 — Congo
 Barylestis occidentalis (Simon, 1887) — Congo, Uganda, Sudan
 Barylestis peltatus (Strand, 1916) — Central Africa
 Barylestis saaristoi Jäger, 2008 — China, Thailand, Myanmar
 Barylestis scutatus (Pocock, 1903) — Cameroon
 Barylestis variatus (Pocock, 1900) — West Africa. Introduced to Northern Ireland, Britain, Belgium, Netherlands, Germany, Czech Rep.

Beregama

Beregama Hirst, 1990 - Deleninae
 Beregama aurea (L. Koch, 1875) (type) — Australia (Queensland, New South Wales)
 Beregama cordata (L. Koch, 1875) — Australia (New South Wales)
 Beregama goliath (Chrysanthus, 1965) — New Guinea
 Beregama herculea (Thorell, 1881) — New Guinea

Berlandia

Berlandia Lessert, 1921 - Incertae Sedis
 Berlandia longipes Lessert, 1921 (type) — East Africa
 Berlandia tenebricola Simon & Fage, 1922 — East Africa

Bhutaniella

Bhutaniella Jäger, 2000 - Heteropodinae
 Bhutaniella dunlopi Jäger, 2001 — Bhutan
 Bhutaniella gruberi Jäger, 2001 — Bhutan
 Bhutaniella haenggii Jäger, 2001 — Bhutan
 Bhutaniella hillyardi Jäger, 2000 (type) — Nepal
 Bhutaniella kronestedti Vedel & Jäger, 2005 — China
 Bhutaniella latissima Zhong & Liu, 2014 — Taiwan
 Bhutaniella rollardae Jäger, 2001 — Nepal
 Bhutaniella scharffi Vedel & Jäger, 2005 — China
 Bhutaniella sikkimensis (Gravely, 1931) — India
 Bhutaniella zhui Zhu & Zhang, 2011 — China

C

Caayguara

Caayguara Rheims, 2010 - Incertae Sedis
 Caayguara ajuba Rheims, 2010 — Brazil
 Caayguara album (Mello-Leitão, 1918) (type) — Brazil
 Caayguara apiaba Rheims, 2010 — Brazil
 Caayguara atyaia Rheims, 2010 — Brazil
 Caayguara catuoca Rheims, 2010 — Brazil
 Caayguara cupepemassu Rheims, 2010 — Brazil
 Caayguara cupepemayri Rheims, 2010 — Brazil
 Caayguara itajucamussi Rheims, 2010 — Brazil
 Caayguara juati Rheims, 2010 — Brazil
 Caayguara pinda Rheims, 2010 — Brazil
 Caayguara poi Rheims, 2010 — Brazil
 Caayguara ybityriguara Rheims, 2010 — Brazil

† Caduceator
† Caduceator Petrunkevitch, 1942 - Incertae Sedis
 † Caduceator minutus Petrunkevitch, 1942 (type) — Palaeogen Baltic amber
 † Caduceator quadrimaculatus Petrunkevitch, 1950 — Palaeogen Baltic amber

Carparachne
Carparachne Lawrence, 1962 - Incertae Sedis
 Carparachne alba Lawrence, 1962 (type) — Namibia
 Carparachne aureoflava Lawrence, 1966 — Namibia

Cebrennus

Cebrennus Simon, 1880 - Sparassinae
 Cebrennus aethiopicus Simon, 1880 — Ethiopia, Eritrea, Sudan, Djibouti, Saudi Arabia
 Cebrennus atlas Jäger, 2014 — Morocco
 Cebrennus castaneitarsis Simon, 1880 — Algeria to Israel
 Cebrennus concolor (Denis, 1947) — Egypt
 Cebrennus cultrifer Fage, 1921 — Algeria
 Cebrennus flagellatus Jäger, 2014 — Afghanistan
 Cebrennus intermedius Jäger, 2000 — Saudi Arabia
 Cebrennus kochi (O. Pickard-Cambridge, 1872) — Syria, Israel
 Cebrennus laurae Jäger, 2014 — Canary Is.
 Cebrennus logunovi Jäger, 2000 — Turkmenistan
 Cebrennus mayri Jäger, 2000 — Oman
 Cebrennus powelli Fage, 1921 — Morocco
 Cebrennus rambodjavani Moradmand, Zamani & Jäger, 2016 — Iran
 Cebrennus rechenbergi Jäger, 2014 — Morocco
 Cebrennus rungsi Jäger, 2000 — Morocco
 Cebrennus sumer Al-Khazali & Jäger, 2019 — Iraq
 Cebrennus tunetanus Simon, 1885 — Tunisia
 Cebrennus villosus (Jézéquel & Junqua, 1966) — Algeria, Tunisia
 Cebrennus wagae (Simon, 1874) (type) — Malta, Algeria, Tunisia, Libya

Cerbalus

Cerbalus Simon, 1897 - Sparassinae
 Cerbalus alegranzaensis Wunderlich, 1992 — Canary Is.
 Cerbalus aravaensis Levy, 2007 — Israel, Jordan
 Cerbalus ergensis Jäger, 2000 — Tunisia
 Cerbalus negebensis Levy, 1989 — Israel
 Cerbalus pellitus Kritscher, 1960 — Egypt
 Cerbalus psammodes Levy, 1989 — Egypt, Israel
 Cerbalus pulcherrimus (Simon, 1880) (type) — North Africa
 Cerbalus verneaui (Simon, 1889) — Canary Is.

Chrosioderma

Chrosioderma Simon, 1897 - Incertae Sedis
 Chrosioderma albidum Simon, 1897 (type) — Madagascar
 Chrosioderma analalava Silva-Dávila, 2005 — Madagascar
 Chrosioderma havia Silva-Dávila, 2005 — Madagascar
 Chrosioderma mahavelona Silva-Dávila, 2005 — Madagascar
 Chrosioderma mipentinapentina Silva-Dávila, 2005 — Madagascar
 Chrosioderma namoroka Silva-Dávila, 2005 — Madagascar
 Chrosioderma ranomafana Silva-Dávila, 2005 — Madagascar
 Chrosioderma roaloha Silva-Dávila, 2005 — Madagascar
 Chrosioderma soalala Silva-Dávila, 2005 — Madagascar

Clastes

Clastes Walckenaer, 1837 - Incertae Sedis
 Clastes freycineti Walckenaer, 1837 (type) — Indonesia (Moluccas), New Guinea

† Collacteus
† Collacteus Petrunkevitch, 1942
 † Collacteus  captivus Petrunkevitch, 1942 (type) — Palaeogen Baltic amber

Curicaberis

Curicaberis Rheims, 2015 - Sparassinae
 Curicaberis abnormis (Keyserling, 1884) — USA, Mexico
 Curicaberis annulatus (F. O. Pickard-Cambridge, 1900) — Mexico
 Curicaberis azul Rheims, 2015 — Mexico
 Curicaberis bagaces Rheims, 2015 — Costa Rica
 Curicaberis bibranchiatus (Fox, 1937) — USA, Mexico
 Curicaberis catarinas Rheims, 2015 — Mexico
 Curicaberis chamela Rheims, 2015 — Mexico
 Curicaberis chiapas Rheims, 2015 — Mexico, Guatemala
 Curicaberis culiacan Rheims, 2015 — Mexico
 Curicaberis cuyutlan Rheims, 2015 — Mexico
 Curicaberis durango Rheims, 2015 — Mexico
 Curicaberis eberhardi Rheims, 2015 — Mexico
 Curicaberis elpunto Rheims, 2015 — Mexico
 Curicaberis ensiger (F. O. Pickard-Cambridge, 1900) — Mexico
 Curicaberis ferrugineus (C. L. Koch, 1836) (type) — USA, Mexico, Guatemala, Brazil
 Curicaberis granada Rheims, 2015 — Nicaragua, Costa Rica
 Curicaberis huitiupan Rheims, 2015 — Mexico
 Curicaberis jalisco Rheims, 2015 — Mexico
 Curicaberis luctuosus (Banks, 1898) — Mexico
 Curicaberis manifestus (O. Pickard-Cambridge, 1890) — Mexico, Guatemala, Costa Rica
 Curicaberis minax (O. Pickard-Cambridge, 1896) — Mexico
 Curicaberis mitla Rheims, 2015 — Mexico
 Curicaberis pedregal Rheims, 2015 — Mexico
 Curicaberis peninsulanus (Banks, 1898) — USA, Mexico
 Curicaberis potosi Rheims, 2015 — Mexico
 Curicaberis puebla Rheims, 2015 — Mexico
 Curicaberis sanpedrito Rheims, 2015 — Mexico
 Curicaberis tepic Rheims, 2015 — Mexico
 Curicaberis tortugero Rheims, 2015 — Mexico
 Curicaberis urquizai Rheims, 2015 — Mexico
 Curicaberis yerba Rheims, 2015 — Mexico
 Curicaberis zapotec Rheims, 2015 — Mexico

D

Damastes

Damastes Simon, 1880 - Incertae Sedis
 Damastes atrignathus Strand, 1908 — Madagascar
 Damastes coquereli Simon, 1880 — Madagascar
 Damastes coquereli affinis Strand, 1907 — Madagascar
 Damastes decoratus (Simon, 1897) — Madagascar
 Damastes fasciolatus (Simon, 1903) — Madagascar
 Damastes flavomaculatus Simon, 1880 — Madagascar
 Damastes grandidieri Simon, 1880 (type) — Madagascar
 Damastes majungensis Strand, 1907 — Madagascar
 Damastes malagassus (Fage, 1926) — Madagascar
 Damastes malagasus (Karsch, 1881) — Madagascar
 Damastes masculinus Strand, 1908 — Madagascar
 Damastes nigrichelis (Strand, 1907) — Mozambique
 Damastes nossibeensis Strand, 1907 — Madagascar
 Damastes oswaldi Lenz, 1891 — Madagascar
 Damastes pallidus (Schenkel, 1937) — Madagascar
 Damastes sikoranus Strand, 1906 — Madagascar
 Damastes validus (Blackwall, 1877) — Seychelles

Decaphora

Decaphora Franganillo, 1931 - Sparianthinae
 Decaphora cubana (Banks, 1909) (type) — USA, Bahamas, Cuba
 Decaphora kohunlich Rheims & Alayón, 2014 — Mexico, Guatemala
 Decaphora pestai (Reimoser, 1939) — Belize, Nicaragua, Costa Rica
 Decaphora planada Rheims, 2017 — Colombia
 Decaphora variabilis (F. O. Pickard-Cambridge, 1900) — Mexico

Defectrix

Defectrix Petrunkevitch, 1925 - Incertae Sedis
 Defectrix defectrix Petrunkevitch, 1925 (type) — Panama

Delena

Delena Walckenaer, 1837 - Deleninae
 Delena cancerides Walckenaer, 1837 (type) — Australia, Tasmania, New Zealand
 Delena convexa (Hirst, 1991) — Australia (Western Australia) 
 Delena craboides Walckenaer, 1837 — Australia
 Delena gloriosa (Rainbow, 1917) — Australia (South Australia)
 Delena kosciuskoensis (Hirst, 1991) — Australia (New South Wales)
 Delena lapidicola (Hirst, 1991) — Australia (Western Australia)
 Delena loftiensis (Hirst, 1991) — Australia (South Australia)
 Delena melanochelis (Strand, 1913) — Australia (Victoria)
 Delena nigrifrons (Simon, 1908) — Australia (Western Australia)
 Delena spenceri (Hogg, 1903) — Australia (Tasmania, King Is.)
 Delena tasmaniensis (Hirst, 1991) — Australia (Tasmania)

Dermochrosia

Dermochrosia Mello-Leitão, 1940 - Incertae Sedis
 Dermochrosia maculatissima Mello-Leitão, 1940 (type) — Brazil

Diminutella

Diminutella Rheims & Alayón, 2018 - Sparianthinae
 Diminutella cortina Rheims & Alayón, 2018 — Cuba

E

† Eostaianus
† Eostaianus Petrunkevitch, 1950 - Incertae Sedis
 † Eostaianus succini Petrunkevitch, 1950 (type) — Palaeogen Baltic amber

† Eostasina
† Eostasina Petrunkevitch, 1942 - Incertae Sedis
 † Eostasina  aculeata Petrunkevitch, 1942 (type) — Palaeogen Baltic amber

Eusparassus

Eusparassus Simon, 1903 - Incertae Sedis
 Eusparassus arabicus Moradmand, 2013 — Saudi Arabia, United Arab Emirates
 Eusparassus atlanticus Simon, 1909 — Morocco
 Eusparassus barbarus (Lucas, 1846) — Algeria, Tunisia
 Eusparassus bicorniger (Pocock, 1898) — Egypt, Ethiopia, East Africa
 Eusparassus borakalalo Moradmand, 2013 — South Africa
 † Eusparassus crassipes C. L. Koch & Berendt, 1854 — Palaeogen Baltic amber
 Eusparassus doriae (Simon, 1874) — Iran
 Eusparassus dufouri Simon, 1932 (type) — Portugal, Spain, Netherlands (introduced)
 Eusparassus educatus Moradmand, 2013 — Namibia
 Eusparassus fritschi (C. Koch, 1873) — Morocco
 Eusparassus fuscimanus Denis, 1958 — Afghanistan
 Eusparassus jaegeri Moradmand, 2013 — Botswana, South Africa
 Eusparassus jocquei Moradmand, 2013 — Zimbabwe
 Eusparassus kronebergi Denis, 1958 — Iran, Afghanistan, India
 Eusparassus laevatus (Simon, 1897) — Ethiopia, Djibouti, Somalia, Arabian Peninsula
 Eusparassus laterifuscus Strand, 1908 — Madagascar
 Eusparassus letourneuxi (Simon, 1874) — Algeria, Tunisia
 Eusparassus levantinus Urones, 2006 — Spain
 Eusparassus maynardi (Pocock, 1901) — Pakistan
 Eusparassus mesopotamicus Moradmand & Jäger, 2012 — Iraq, Iran
 Eusparassus oculatus (Kroneberg, 1875) — Iran, Central Asia to China
 Eusparassus oraniensis (Lucas, 1846) — North Africa
 Eusparassus pearsoni (Pocock, 1901) — India
 Eusparassus perezi (Simon, 1902) — Somalia, Djibouti, Arabian Peninsula
 Eusparassus pontii Caporiacco, 1935 — India, Pakistan
 Eusparassus potanini (Simon, 1895) — China
 Eusparassus reverentia Moradmand, 2013 — Burkina Faso, Nigeria
 Eusparassus schoemanae Moradmand, 2013 — Namibia, South Africa
 Eusparassus shefteli Chamberlin, 1916 — Peru
 Eusparassus syrticus Simon, 1909 — Tunisia
 Eusparassus tuckeri Lawrence, 1927 — Angola, Namibia
 Eusparassus vestigator (Simon, 1897) — East Africa
 Eusparassus walckenaeri (Audouin, 1826) — Sudan, Algeria to Iraq
 Eusparassus xerxes (Pocock, 1901) — United Arab Emirates, Iran, Pakistan

Exopalystes

Exopalystes Hogg, 1914 - Incertae Sedis
 Exopalystes pulchellus Hogg, 1914 (type) — New Guinea

Extraordinarius

Extraordinarius Rheims, 2019 - Sparianthinae
 Extraordinarius andrematosi Rheims, 2019 (type) — Brazil
 Extraordinarius brucedickinsoni Rheims, 2019 — Brazil
 Extraordinarius klausmeinei Rheims, 2019 — Brazil
 Extraordinarius rickalleni Rheims, 2019 — Brazil

G

Geminia

Geminia Thorell, 1897 - Incertae Sedis
 Geminia sulphurea Thorell, 1897 (type) — Myanmar

Gnathopalystes

Gnathopalystes Rainbow, 1899 - Incertae Sedis
 Gnathopalystes aureolus (He & Hu, 2000) — China (Hainan)
 Gnathopalystes crucifer (Simon, 1880) — Malaysia or Indonesia (Java)
 Gnathopalystes denticulatus (Saha & Raychaudhuri, 2007) — India
 Gnathopalystes ferox Rainbow, 1899 (type) — Vanuatu
 Gnathopalystes ignicomus (L. Koch, 1875) — Papua New Guinea (New Ireland, New Britain)
 Gnathopalystes kochi (Simon, 1880) — India, Myanmar, Malaysia, Indonesia (Java, Sumatra, Borneo)
 Gnathopalystes nigriventer (Kulczyński, 1910) — New Guinea, Solomon Is.
 Gnathopalystes nigrocornutus (Merian, 1911) — Indonesia (Sulawesi)
 Gnathopalystes rutilans (Simon, 1899) — Indonesia (Sumatra)
 Gnathopalystes taiwanensis Zhu & Tso, 2006 — Taiwan

Guadana

Guadana Rheims, 2010 - Heteropodinae
 Guadana manauara Rheims, 2010 (type) — Brazil
 Guadana neblina Rheims, 2010 — Brazil
 Guadana panguana Rheims, 2010 — Peru
 Guadana quillu Rheims, 2010 — Ecuador
 Guadana tambopata Rheims, 2010 — Peru
 Guadana urucu Rheims, 2010 — Brazil

H

Heteropoda

Heteropoda Latreille, 1804 - Heteropodinae
 Heteropoda acuta Davies, 1994 — Australia (Queensland)
 Heteropoda aemulans Bayer & Jäger, 2009 — Laos
 Heteropoda afghana Roewer, 1962 — Afghanistan, Pakistan, India
 Heteropoda alta Davies, 1994 — Australia (Queensland)
 Heteropoda altithorax Strand, 1907 — India
 Heteropoda altmannae Jäger, 2008 — Vietnam
 Heteropoda amphora Fox, 1936 — China, Hong Kong
 Heteropoda analis Thorell, 1881 — New Guinea, Indonesia (Aru Is.)
 Heteropoda armillata (Thorell, 1887) — Myanmar, Indonesia (Sumatra)
 Heteropoda atollicola Pocock, 1904 — Maldive Is.
 Heteropoda atriventris Chrysanthus, 1965 — New Guinea
 Heteropoda badiella Roewer, 1951 — Indonesia (Moluccas)
 Heteropoda bellendenker Davies, 1994 — Australia (Queensland)
 Heteropoda belua Jäger, 2005 — Borneo
 Heteropoda beroni Jäger, 2005 — Indonesia (Sulawesi)
 Heteropoda bhaikakai Patel & Patel, 1973 — India
 Heteropoda binnaburra Davies, 1994 — Australia (Queensland, New South Wales)
 Heteropoda boiei (Doleschall, 1859) — Malaysia, Indonesia (Sumatra, Java, Borneo)
 Heteropoda bonthainensis Merian, 1911 — Indonesia (Sulawesi)
 Heteropoda borneensis (Thorell, 1890) — Borneo
 Heteropoda boutani (Simon, 1906) — Vietnam
 Heteropoda bulburin Davies, 1994 — Australia (Queensland)
 Heteropoda camelia Strand, 1914 — Colombia
 Heteropoda cavernicola Davies, 1994 — Australia (Western Australia)
 Heteropoda cece Jäger, 2014 — Borneo
 Heteropoda cervina (L. Koch, 1875) — Australia (Queensland)
 Heteropoda chelata (Strand, 1911) — New Guinea
 Heteropoda chelata vittichelis (Strand, 1911) — New Guinea
 Heteropoda chengbuensis Wang, 1990 — China
 Heteropoda christae Jäger, 2008 — Malaysia, Singapore, Indonesia (Sumatra)
 Heteropoda conwayensis Davies, 1994 — Australia (Queensland)
 Heteropoda cooki Davies, 1994 — Australia (Queensland)
 Heteropoda cooloola Davies, 1994 — Australia (Queensland)
 Heteropoda crassa Simon, 1880 — Indonesia (Java)
 Heteropoda crediton Davies, 1994 — Australia (Queensland)
 Heteropoda cyanichelis Strand, 1907 — Indonesia (Java)
 Heteropoda cyanognatha Thorell, 1881 — Papua New Guinea (Yule Is.)
 Heteropoda cyperusiria Barrion & Litsinger, 1995 — Philippines
 Heteropoda dagmarae Jäger & Vedel, 2005 — Laos, Thailand
 Heteropoda dasyurina (Hogg, 1914) — New Guinea
 Heteropoda davidbowie Jäger, 2008 — Malaysia, Singapore, Indonesia (Sumatra)
 Heteropoda debilis (L. Koch, 1875) — Samoa
 Heteropoda distincta Davies, 1994 — Australia (Queensland, New South Wales)
 Heteropoda duan Jäger, 2008 — Borneo
 Heteropoda duo Jäger, 2014 — Borneo
 Heteropoda elatana Strand, 1911 — Indonesia (Kei Is., Aru Is.)
 Heteropoda eluta Karsch, 1892 — Sri Lanka
 Heteropoda emarginativulva Strand, 1907 — India
 Heteropoda ernstulrichi Jäger, 2008 — Indonesia (Sumatra)
 Heteropoda erythra Chrysanthus, 1965 — New Guinea
 Heteropoda eungella Davies, 1994 — Australia (Queensland)
 Heteropoda fabrei Simon, 1885 — India
 Heteropoda fischeri Jäger, 2005 — India
 Heteropoda flavocephala Merian, 1911 — Indonesia (Sulawesi)
 Heteropoda furva Thorell, 1890 — Malaysia
 Heteropoda garciai Barrion & Litsinger, 1995 — Philippines
 Heteropoda gemella Simon, 1877 — Philippines
 Heteropoda goonaneman Davies, 1994 — Australia (Queensland)
 Heteropoda gordonensis Davies, 1994 — Australia (Queensland)
 Heteropoda gourae Monga, Sadana & Singh, 1988 — India
 Heteropoda graaflandi Strand, 1907 — Indonesia (Java)
 Heteropoda grooteeylandt Davies, 1994 — Australia (Northern Territory)
 Heteropoda gyirongensis Hu & Li, 1987 — China
 Heteropoda hampsoni Pocock, 1901 — India
 Heteropoda helge Jäger, 2008 — China
 Heteropoda hermitis (Hogg, 1914) — Australia (Western Australia)
 Heteropoda hildebrandti Jäger, 2008 — Indonesia (Moluccas)
 Heteropoda hillerae Davies, 1994 — Australia (Queensland)
 Heteropoda hippie Jäger, 2008 — Indonesia (Sumatra)
 Heteropoda hirsti Jäger, 2008 — New Guinea
 Heteropoda holoventris Davies, 1994 — Australia (Queensland)
 Heteropoda homstu Jäger, 2008 — Indonesia (Sumatra, Java, Borneo)
 Heteropoda hosei Pocock, 1897 — Borneo
 Heteropoda hupingensis Peng & Yin, 2001 — China
 Heteropoda ignichelis (Simon, 1880) — Vietnam
 Heteropoda imbecilla Thorell, 1892 — Malaysia, Indonesia (Sumatra)
 Heteropoda jacobii Strand, 1911 — New Guinea
 Heteropoda jaegerorum Jäger, 2008 — Singapore, Indonesia (Sumatra)
 Heteropoda jasminae Jäger, 2008 — Vietnam
 Heteropoda javana (Simon, 1880) — Malaysia, Indonesia (Java, Sumatra)
 Heteropoda jiangxiensis Li, 1991 — China
 Heteropoda jugulans (L. Koch, 1876) — Australia (Queensland)
 Heteropoda kabaenae Strand, 1911 — Indonesia (Sulawesi)
 Heteropoda kalbarri Davies, 1994 — Australia (Western Australia)
 Heteropoda kandiana Pocock, 1899 — India, Sri Lanka
 Heteropoda kuekenthali Pocock, 1897 — Indonesia (Moluccas)
 Heteropoda kuluensis Sethi & Tikader, 1988 — India
 Heteropoda kusi Jäger, 2014 — Borneo
 Heteropoda laai Jäger, 2008 — Singapore, Indonesia (Sumatra)
 Heteropoda languida Simon, 1887 — Myanmar
 Heteropoda lashbrooki (Hogg, 1922) — Vietnam
 Heteropoda lentula Pocock, 1901 — India
 Heteropoda leprosa Simon, 1884 — India, Myanmar, Malaysia
 Heteropoda leptoscelis Thorell, 1892 — Indonesia (Sumatra)
 Heteropoda lindbergi Roewer, 1962 — Afghanistan
 Heteropoda listeri Pocock, 1900 — Australia (Christmas Is.)
 Heteropoda loderstaedti Jäger, 2008 — Malaysia, Indonesia (Sumatra)
 Heteropoda longipes (L. Koch, 1875) — Australia (New South Wales)
 Heteropoda lunula (Doleschall, 1857) — India to Vietnam, Malaysia, Indonesia (Java, Sumatra, Borneo)
 Heteropoda luwuensis Merian, 1911 — Indonesia (Sulawesi)
 Heteropoda malitiosa Simon, 1906 — India
 Heteropoda marillana Davies, 1994 — Australia (Western Australia)
 Heteropoda martinae Jäger, 2008 — Indonesia (Sumatra)
 Heteropoda martusa Jäger, 2000 — Indonesia (Sumatra)
 Heteropoda maukin Jäger, 2014 — Borneo
 Heteropoda maxima Jäger, 2001 — Laos
 Heteropoda mecistopus Pocock, 1898 — Solomon Is.
 Heteropoda mediocris Simon, 1880 — New Guinea
 Heteropoda meriani Jäger, 2008 — Indonesia (Sulawesi)
 Heteropoda merkarensis Strand, 1907 — India
 Heteropoda meticulosa Simon, 1880 — Peru
 Heteropoda minahassae Merian, 1911 — Indonesia (Sulawesi)
 Heteropoda mindiptanensis Chrysanthus, 1965 — New Guinea
 Heteropoda modiglianii Thorell, 1890 — Indonesia (Java)
 Heteropoda monroei Davies, 1994 — Australia (Queensland)
 Heteropoda montana Thorell, 1890 — Indonesia (Sumatra)
 Heteropoda monteithi Davies, 1994 — Australia (Queensland)
 Heteropoda mossman Davies, 1994 — Australia (Queensland)
 Heteropoda murina (Pocock, 1897) — Borneo
 Heteropoda muscicapa Strand, 1911 — New Guinea
 Heteropoda nagarigoon Davies, 1994 — Australia (Queensland, New South Wales)
 Heteropoda natans Jäger, 2005 — Borneo
 Heteropoda nebulosa Thorell, 1890 — Malaysia
 Heteropoda nigriventer Pocock, 1897 — Indonesia (Sulawesi)
 Heteropoda nilgirina Pocock, 1901 — India
 Heteropoda ninahagen Jäger, 2008 — Malaysia
 Heteropoda nirounensis (Simon, 1903) — India, Indonesia (Sumatra)
 Heteropoda nobilis (L. Koch, 1875) — Vanuatu, Australia, Polynesia
 Heteropoda novaguineensis Strand, 1911 — New Guinea
 Heteropoda nyalama Hu & Li, 1987 — China
 Heteropoda obe Jäger, 2014 — Indonesia (Sulawesi)
 Heteropoda obtusa Thorell, 1890 — Borneo
 Heteropoda ocyalina (Simon, 1887) — Indonesia (Java, Sumatra)
 † Heteropoda Ocypete angustifrons Menge in C. L. Koch & Berendt, 1854 — Palaeogene Baltic amber
 † Heteropoda Ocypete marginata Menge in C. L. Koch & Berendt, 1854 — Palaeogene Baltic amber
 Heteropoda onoi Jäger, 2008 — China, Vietnam
 Heteropoda opo Jäger, 2014 — Myanmar
 Heteropoda pakawini Jäger, 2008 — Thailand
 Heteropoda parva Jäger, 2000 — Malaysia, Indonesia (Sumatra, Borneo)
 Heteropoda pedata Strand, 1907 — India
 Heteropoda pedata magna Strand, 1909 — India
 Heteropoda pekkai Jäger, 2014 — Bhutan
 Heteropoda phasma Simon, 1897 — India
 Heteropoda pingtungensis Zhu & Tso, 2006 — China, Taiwan
 Heteropoda planiceps (Pocock, 1897) — Indonesia (Moluccas)
 Heteropoda plebeja Thorell, 1887 — Myanmar
 Heteropoda pressula Simon, 1886 — Vietnam
 Heteropoda procera (L. Koch, 1867) — Australia (Queensland, New South Wales)
 Heteropoda raveni Davies, 1994 — Australia (Queensland)
 Heteropoda reinholdae Jäger, 2008 — Indonesia (Sumatra)
 Heteropoda renibulbis Davies, 1994 — Australia (Western Australia, Northern Territory, Queensland)
 Heteropoda richlingi Jäger, 2008 — Indonesia (Sumatra, Java)
 Heteropoda robusta Fage, 1924 — India
 Heteropoda rosea Karsch, 1879 — Colombia
 † Heteropoda rpbusta Hong, 1985 — Neogene Shanwang
 Heteropoda rubra Chrysanthus, 1965 — New Guinea
 Heteropoda rufognatha Strand, 1907 — India
 Heteropoda rundle Davies, 1994 — Australia (Queensland)
 Heteropoda ruricola Thorell, 1881 — New Guinea
 Heteropoda sarotoides Järvi, 1914 — New Guinea
 Heteropoda sartrix (L. Koch, 1865) — Australia
 Heteropoda schlaginhaufeni Strand, 1911 — New Guinea
 Heteropoda schwalbachorum Jäger, 2008 — China
 Heteropoda schwendingeri Jäger, 2005 — Thailand
 Heteropoda sexpunctata Simon, 1885 — India, Malaysia
 Heteropoda signata Thorell, 1890 — Indonesia (Sumatra)
 Heteropoda silvatica Davies, 1994 — Australia (Queensland)
 Heteropoda simoneallmannae Jäger, 2018 — Philippines (Palawan)
 Heteropoda simplex Jäger & Ono, 2000 — Laos, Taiwan, Japan (Ryukyu Is.)
 Heteropoda speciosus (Pocock, 1898) — Solomon Is.
 Heteropoda spenceri Davies, 1994 — Australia (Northern Territory)
 Heteropoda spinipes (Pocock, 1897) — Indonesia (Moluccas)
 Heteropoda spurgeon Davies, 1994 — Australia (Queensland)
 Heteropoda squamacea Wang, 1990 — China
 Heteropoda steineri Bayer & Jäger, 2009 — Laos
 Heteropoda strandi Jäger, 2002 — Indonesia (Sumatra)
 Heteropoda strasseni Strand, 1915 — Indonesia (Java)
 Heteropoda striata Merian, 1911 — Indonesia (Sulawesi)
 Heteropoda striatipes (Leardi, 1902) — India
 Heteropoda submaculata Thorell, 1881 — New Guinea
 Heteropoda submaculata torricelliana Strand, 1911 — New Guinea
 Heteropoda subplebeia Strand, 1907 — India
 Heteropoda subtilis Karsch, 1892 — Sri Lanka
 Heteropoda sumatrana Thorell, 1890 — Indonesia (Java, Sumatra)
 Heteropoda sumatrana javacola Strand, 1907 — Indonesia (Java)
 Heteropoda teranganica Strand, 1911 — Indonesia (Aru Is.)
 Heteropoda tetrica Thorell, 1897 — China to Indonesia (Sumatra)
 Heteropoda udolindenberg Jäger, 2008 — Indonesia (Sumatra)
 Heteropoda uexkuelli Jäger, 2008 — Bali
 Heteropoda umbrata Karsch, 1892 — Sri Lanka
 Heteropoda variegata (Simon, 1874) — Greece to Israel
 Heteropoda veiliana Strand, 1907 — India
 Heteropoda venatoria (Linnaeus, 1767) (type) — Tropical Asia. Introduced to Pacific Is., North, Central and South America, Macaronesia, Europe, Africa
 Heteropoda venatoria emarginata Thorell, 1881 — Indonesia (Western New Guinea)
 Heteropoda venatoria foveolata Thorell, 1881 — New Guinea, Papua New Guinea (Yule Is.)
 Heteropoda venatoria pseudoemarginata Strand, 1909 — Indonesia (Java)
 Heteropoda vespersa Davies, 1994 — Australia (Queensland)
 Heteropoda warrumbungle Davies, 1994 — Australia (New South Wales)
 Heteropoda warthiana Strand, 1907 — India
 Heteropoda willunga Davies, 1994 — Australia (Queensland)
 Heteropoda zuviele Jäger, 2008 — Vietnam, Taiwan

Holconia

Holconia Thorell, 1877 - Deleninae
 Holconia colberti Hirst, 1991 — Australia (Victoria)
 Holconia flindersi Hirst, 1991 — Australia (South Australia, Victoria, New South Wales)
 Holconia hirsuta (L. Koch, 1875) — Australia (Queensland)
 Holconia immanis (L. Koch, 1867) — Australia
 Holconia insignis (Thorell, 1870) (type) — Australia (Queensland, New South Wales)
 Holconia murrayensis Hirst, 1991 — Australia (South Australia, Victoria, New South Wales)
 Holconia neglecta Hirst, 1991 — Australia (Western Australia, Northern Territory)
 Holconia nigrigularis (Simon, 1908) — Australia
 Holconia westralia Hirst, 1991 — Australia (Western Australia)

I

Irileka

Irileka Hirst, 1998 - Incertae Sedis
 Irileka iridescens Hirst, 1998 (type) — Australia (Western Australia)

Isopeda

Isopeda L. Koch, 1875 - Deleninae
 Isopeda alpina Hirst, 1992 — Australia (New South Wales, Victoria)
 Isopeda binnaburra Hirst, 1992 — Australia (Queensland)
 Isopeda brachyseta Hirst, 1992 — Australia (New South Wales)
 Isopeda canberrana Hirst, 1992 — Australia (New South Wales, Victoria)
 Isopeda catmona Barrion & Litsinger, 1995 — Philippines
 Isopeda deianira (Thorell, 1881) — New Guinea
 Isopeda echuca Hirst, 1992 — Australia (New South Wales, Victoria)
 Isopeda girraween Hirst, 1992 — Australia (Queensland)
 Isopeda igraya Barrion & Litsinger, 1995 — Philippines
 Isopeda leishmanni Hogg, 1903 — Australia (Western Australia, South Australia, Victoria)
 Isopeda leishmanni hoggi Simon, 1908 — Australia (Western Australia)
 Isopeda magna Hirst, 1992 — Australia (Western Australia, South Australia)
 Isopeda montana Hogg, 1903 — Australia (South Australia, Victoria)
 Isopeda neocaledonica Berland, 1924 — New Caledonia
 Isopeda parnabyi Hirst, 1992 — Australia (Queensland, New South Wales)
 Isopeda prolata Hirst, 1992 — Australia (New South Wales, Victoria)
 Isopeda queenslandensis Hirst, 1992 — Australia (Queensland, New South Wales)
 Isopeda subalpina Hirst, 1992 — Australia (Victoria)
 Isopeda sungaya Barrion & Litsinger, 1995 — Philippines
 Isopeda vasta (L. Koch, 1867) (type) — Australia (Queensland)
 Isopeda villosa L. Koch, 1875 — Australia (New South Wales)
 Isopeda woodwardi Hogg, 1903 — Australia (South Australia)

Isopedella

Isopedella Hirst, 1990 - Deleninae
 Isopedella ambathala Hirst, 1993 — Australia (Queensland, South Australia)
 Isopedella cana (Simon, 1908) — Australia (Western Australia, South Australia)
 Isopedella castanea Hirst, 1993 — Australia (Western Australia)
 Isopedella cerina Hirst, 1993 — Australia (Queensland)
 Isopedella cerussata (Simon, 1908) — Australia
 Isopedella conspersa (L. Koch, 1875) — Australia (Queensland, Northern Territory)
 Isopedella flavida (L. Koch, 1875) — Australia (Queensland, New South Wales)
 Isopedella frenchi (Hogg, 1903) — Australia (Victoria, South Australia)
 Isopedella gibsandi Hirst, 1993 — Australia (Western Australia)
 Isopedella inola (Strand, 1913) — Australia
 Isopedella inola carinatula (Strand, 1913) — Central Australia
 Isopedella leai (Hogg, 1903) — Australia (South Australia)
 Isopedella maculosa Hirst, 1993 — Australia (Western Australia)
 Isopedella meraukensis (Chrysanthus, 1965) — New Guinea, Australia (Queensland, Northern Territory)
 Isopedella pessleri (Thorell, 1870) (type) — Australia (New South Wales, Victoria)
 Isopedella saundersi (Hogg, 1903) — Australia
 Isopedella terangana (Strand, 1911) — Indonesia (Aru Is.)
 Isopedella tindalei Hirst, 1993 — Australia
 Isopedella victorialis Hirst, 1993 — Australia (Victoria)

K

Keilira

Keilira Hirst, 1989 - Incertae Sedis
 Keilira sokoli Hirst, 1989 — Australia (Victoria)
 Keilira sparsomaculata Hirst, 1989 (type) — Australia (South Australia)

L

Leucorchestris

Leucorchestris Lawrence, 1962 - Incertae Sedis
 Leucorchestris alexandrina Lawrence, 1966 — Angola
 Leucorchestris arenicola Lawrence, 1962 (type) — Namibia
 Leucorchestris flavimarginata Lawrence, 1966 — Namibia
 Leucorchestris porti Lawrence, 1965 — Namibia
 Leucorchestris sabulosa Lawrence, 1966 — Namibia
 Leucorchestris setifrons Lawrence, 1966 — Angola
 Leucorchestris steyni Lawrence, 1965 — Namibia

M

Macrinus

Macrinus Simon, 1887 - Sparassinae
 Macrinus bambuco Rheims, 2010 — Colombia
 Macrinus calypso Rheims, 2010 — Tobago
 Macrinus jaegeri Rheims, 2007 — Brazil
 Macrinus mohavensis (Fox, 1937) — USA
 Macrinus pollexensis (Schenkel, 1953) — Venezuela, Brazil
 Macrinus succineus Simon, 1887 (type) — Ecuador to Brazil

Martensopoda

Martensopoda Jäger, 2006 - Incertae Sedis
 Martensopoda minuscula (Reimoser, 1934) — India
 Martensopoda sanctor Sankaran, Malamel, Joseph & Sebastian, 2015 — India
 Martensopoda transversa Jäger, 2006 (type) — India

May

May Jäger & Krehenwinkel, 2015 - Incertae Sedis
 May ansie Jäger & Krehenwinkel, 2015 — Namibia
 May bruno Jäger & Krehenwinkel, 2015 (type) — South Africa
 May norm Jäger & Krehenwinkel, 2015 — Namibia
 May rudy Jäger & Krehenwinkel, 2015 — Namibia

Megaloremmius

Megaloremmius Simon, 1903 - Incertae Sedis
 Megaloremmius leo Simon, 1903 (type) — Madagascar

Micrommata

Micrommata Latreille, 1804 - Sparassinae
 Micrommata aljibica Urones, 2004 — Spain
 Micrommata aragonensis Urones, 2004 — Spain
 Micrommata darlingi Pocock, 1901 — South Africa
 Micrommata formosa Pavesi, 1878 — Algeria to Israel
 Micrommata ligurina (C. L. Koch, 1845) — Mediterranean to Central Asia
 Micrommata virescens (Clerck, 1757) (type) — Europe, Turkey, Caucasus, Russia (Europe to Far East), Central Asia, China, Korea, Japan
 Micrommata virescens ornata (Walckenaer, 1802) — Europe, Syria, Israel

Microrchestris

Microrchestris Lawrence, 1962 - Incertae Sedis
 Microrchestris melanogaster Lawrence, 1962 (type) — Namibia
 Microrchestris scutatus Lawrence, 1966 — Namibia

N

Neosparassus

Neosparassus Hogg, 1903 - Deleninae
 Neosparassus calligaster (Thorell, 1870) — Australia
 Neosparassus conspicuus (L. Koch, 1875) — Australia (Queensland)
 Neosparassus diana (L. Koch, 1875) (type) — Australia (Western Australia, Victoria, Tasmania)
 Neosparassus festivus (L. Koch, 1875) — Australia (New South Wales)
 Neosparassus grapsus (Walckenaer, 1837) — Australia
 Neosparassus haemorrhoidalis (L. Koch, 1875) — Australia (New South Wales)
 Neosparassus incomtus (L. Koch, 1875) — Australia (New South Wales)
 Neosparassus inframaculatus (Hogg, 1896) — Central Australia
 Neosparassus macilentus (L. Koch, 1875) — Australia (Queensland, Victoria)
 Neosparassus magareyi Hogg, 1903 — Australia
 Neosparassus nitellinus (L. Koch, 1875) — Australia (Queensland)
 Neosparassus pallidus (L. Koch, 1875) — Australia (Queensland)
 Neosparassus patellatus (Karsch, 1878) — Australia (Tasmania)
 Neosparassus pictus (L. Koch, 1875) — Australia (Queensland)
 Neosparassus praeclarus (L. Koch, 1875) — Australia (Queensland)
 Neosparassus punctatus (L. Koch, 1865) — Australia
 Neosparassus rutilus (L. Koch, 1875) — Australia (Queensland)
 Neosparassus salacius (L. Koch, 1875) — Australia (Queensland, New South Wales)
 Neosparassus thoracicus Hogg, 1903 — Northern Australia

Neostasina

Neostasina Rheims & Alayón, 2016 - Sparianthinae
 Neostasina amalie Rheims & Alayón, 2016 — Virgin Is.
 Neostasina antiguensis (Bryant, 1923) — Antigua and Barbuda (Antigua)
 Neostasina baoruco Rheims & Alayón, 2016 — Dominican Rep.
 Neostasina bermudezi Rheims & Alayón, 2016 — Dominican Rep.
 Neostasina bicolor (Banks, 1914) — Jamaica, Haiti, Dominican Rep., Puerto Rico
 Neostasina bryantae Rheims & Alayón, 2016 — Cuba
 Neostasina cachote Rheims & Alayón, 2016 — Dominican Rep.
 Neostasina croix Rheims & Alayón, 2016 — Virgin Is.
 Neostasina elverde Rheims & Alayón, 2016 — Puerto Rico
 Neostasina granpiedra Rheims & Alayón, 2016 — Cuba
 Neostasina guanaboa Rheims & Alayón, 2016 — Jamaica
 Neostasina gunboat Rheims & Alayón, 2016 — Jamaica
 Neostasina iberia Rheims & Alayón, 2016 — Cuba
 Neostasina jamaicana Rheims & Alayón, 2016 — Jamaica
 Neostasina liguanea Rheims & Alayón, 2016 — Jamaica
 Neostasina lucasi (Bryant, 1940) — Cuba
 Neostasina lucea Rheims & Alayón, 2016 — Jamaica
 Neostasina macleayi (Bryant, 1940) (type) — Cuba
 Neostasina mammee Rheims & Alayón, 2016 — Jamaica
 Neostasina maroon Rheims & Alayón, 2016 — Jamaica
 Neostasina montegordo Rheims & Alayón, 2016 — Cuba
 Neostasina oualie Rheims & Alayón, 2016 — St. Kitts and Nevis (Nevis)
 Neostasina saetosa (Bryant, 1948) — Dominican Rep., Puerto Rico, Virgin Is.
 Neostasina siempreverde Rheims & Alayón, 2016 — Cuba
 Neostasina taino Rheims & Alayón, 2016 — Dominican Rep., Puerto Rico
 Neostasina turquino Rheims & Alayón, 2016 — Cuba
 Neostasina virginensis Rheims & Alayón, 2016 — Virgin Is.

Nisueta

Nisueta Simon, 1880 - Sparassinae
 Nisueta affinis Strand, 1906 — Sudan
 Nisueta flavescens Caporiacco, 1941 — Ethiopia
 Nisueta kolosvaryi Caporiacco, 1947 — Ethiopia
 Nisueta quadrispilota Simon, 1880 (type) — Tanzania (Zanzibar)
 Nisueta similis Berland, 1922 — Ethiopia

Nolavia

Nolavia Kammerer, 2006 - Sparassinae
 Nolavia rubriventris (Piza, 1939) (type) — Brazil

Nonianus

Nonianus Simon, 1885 - Sparassinae
 Nonianus gaujoni Simon, 1897 — Ecuador
 Nonianus pictus Simon, 1885 (type) — Algeria to Israel
 Nonianus unilateralis Strand, 1908 — Peru

Nungara

Nungara Pinto & Rheims, 2016 - Incertae Sedis
 Nungara anama Pinto & Rheims, 2016 — Brazil
 Nungara gaturama Pinto & Rheims, 2016 — Brazil
 Nungara niveomaculata (Mello-Leitão, 1941) (type) — Ecuador, Brazil

O

Olios

Olios Walckenaer, 1837 - Sparassinae
 Olios abnormis (Blackwall, 1866) — Central Africa
 Olios acolastus (Thorell, 1890) — Indonesia (Sumatra)
 Olios acostae Schenkel, 1953 — Venezuela
 Olios actaeon (Pocock, 1899) — Papua New Guinea (New Britain)
 Olios admiratus (Pocock, 1901) — India
 Olios africanus (Karsch, 1878) — Mozambique
 Olios albertius Strand, 1913 — Central Africa
 Olios alluaudi Simon, 1887 — Ivory Coast
 Olios amanensis Strand, 1907 — East Africa
 Olios annandalei (Simon, 1901) — Malaysia
 Olios antiguensis (Keyserling, 1880) — Caribbean
 Olios antiguensis columbiensis Schmidt, 1971 — Colombia
 Olios argelasius (Walckenaer, 1806) (type) — Mediterranean
 Olios aristophanei Lessert, 1936 — Mozambique
 Olios artemis Hogg, 1916 — New Guinea
 Olios atomarius Simon, 1880 — Peru
 Olios attractus Petrunkevitch, 1911 — Brazil
 Olios audax (Banks, 1909) — Costa Rica
 Olios aurantiacus Mello-Leitão, 1918 — Brazil
 Olios auricomis (Simon, 1880) — Tanzania (Zanzibar)
 Olios banananus Strand, 1916 — Congo
 Olios batesi (Pocock, 1900) — Cameroon
 Olios baulnyi (Simon, 1874) — Morocco, Senegal, Sudan
 Olios benitensis (Pocock, 1900) — Cameroon
 Olios berlandi Roewer, 1951 — New Caledonia
 Olios bhattacharjeei (Saha & Raychaudhuri, 2007) — India
 Olios bhavnagarensis Sethi & Tikader, 1988 — India
 Olios biarmatus Lessert, 1925 — South Africa
 Olios bivittatus Roewer, 1951 — Guyana
 Olios bombilius (F. O. Pickard-Cambridge, 1899) — Peru
 Olios brachycephalus Lawrence, 1938 — South Africa
 Olios bungarensis Strand, 1913 — Indonesia (Sumatra)
 Olios canalae Berland, 1924 — New Caledonia
 Olios canariensis (Lucas, 1838) — Canary Is.
 Olios caprinus Mello-Leitão, 1918 — Brazil
 Olios cayanus Taczanowski, 1872 — Brazil, French Guiana
 Olios ceylonicus (Leardi, 1902) — Sri Lanka
 Olios chelifer Lawrence, 1937 — South Africa
 Olios chiracanthiformis (Strand, 1906) — Ethiopia
 Olios chubbi Lessert, 1923 — South Africa
 Olios clarus (Keyserling, 1880) — Mexico
 Olios claviger (Pocock, 1901) — Zimbabwe
 Olios coccineiventris (Simon, 1880) — Indonesia (Moluccas), New Guinea
 Olios coenobitus Fage, 1926 — Madagascar
 Olios conspersipes (Thorell, 1899) — Cameroon
 Olios corallinus Schmidt, 1971 — Ecuador
 Olios correvoni Lessert, 1921 — East Africa
 Olios correvoni choupangensis Lessert, 1936 — Mozambique
 Olios correvoni nigrifrons Lawrence, 1928 — Southern Africa
 Olios crassus (Banks, 1909) — Costa Rica
 Olios croseiceps (Pocock, 1898) — Malawi
 Olios darlingi (Pocock, 1901) — Zimbabwe
 Olios debalae (Biswas & Roy, 2005) — India
 Olios debilipes Mello-Leitão, 1945 — Argentina
 Olios derasus (C. L. Koch, 1845) — South Africa
 Olios detritus (C. L. Koch, 1845) — South Africa
 Olios diao Jäger, 2012 — Laos
 Olios digitalis Eydoux & Souleyet, 1841 — Unknown
 Olios digitatus Sun, Li & Zhang, 2011 — China
 Olios discolorichelis Caporiacco, 1947 — Guyana
 Olios durlaviae Biswas & Raychaudhuri, 2005 — Bangladesh
 Olios erraticus Fage, 1926 — Madagascar
 Olios erroneus O. Pickard-Cambridge, 1890 — Guatemala to Venezuela
 Olios extensus Berland, 1924 — New Caledonia
 Olios exterritorialis Strand, 1907 — Indonesia (Java or Seram)
 Olios faesi Lessert, 1933 — Angola
 Olios fasciatus (Keyserling, 1880) — Peru, Brazil
 Olios fasciculatus Simon, 1880 — USA (probably mislabeled), Tanzania
 Olios fasciiventris Simon, 1880 — Tanzania (Zanzibar)
 Olios feldmanni Strand, 1915 — Cameroon
 Olios ferox (Thorell, 1892) — Indonesia or Australia
 Olios fimbriatus Chrysanthus, 1965 — New Guinea
 Olios flavens Nicolet, 1849 — Chile
 Olios flavidus (O. Pickard-Cambridge, 1885) — China (Yarkand)
 Olios flavovittatus (Caporiacco, 1935) — Pakistan
 Olios floweri Lessert, 1921 — Ethiopia, East Africa
 Olios fonticola (Pocock, 1902) — South Africa
 Olios formosus Banks, 1929 — Panama
 Olios francoisi (Simon, 1898) — New Caledonia (Loyalty Is.)
 Olios freyi Lessert, 1929 — Congo
 Olios fugax (O. Pickard-Cambridge, 1885) — Pakistan, China (Yarkand)
 Olios fuhrmanni Strand, 1914 — St. Thomas
 Olios fuligineus (Pocock, 1901) — India
 Olios fulvithorax Berland, 1924 — New Caledonia
 Olios galapagoensis Banks, 1902 — Ecuador (Galapagos Is.)
 Olios gentilis (Karsch, 1879) — West Africa
 Olios giganteus Keyserling, 1884 — USA, Mexico
 Olios gravelyi Sethi & Tikader, 1988 — India
 Olios greeni (Pocock, 1901) — Sri Lanka
 Olios guineibius Strand, 1911 — New Guinea
 Olios guttipes (Simon, 1897) — South Africa
 Olios hampsoni (Pocock, 1901) — India
 Olios helvus (Keyserling, 1880) — Colombia
 Olios hirtus (Karsch, 1879) — Sri Lanka
 Olios hoplites Caporiacco, 1941 — Ethiopia
 Olios humboldtianus Berland, 1924 — New Caledonia
 Olios hyeroglyphicus Mello-Leitão, 1918 — Brazil
 Olios inaequipes (Simon, 1890) — Indonesia (Sunda Is.)
 Olios insignifer Chrysanthus, 1965 — New Guinea
 Olios insulanus (Thorell, 1881) — Indonesia (Kei Is.)
 Olios iranii (Pocock, 1901) — Iraq, Pakistan, India
 Olios isongonis Strand, 1915 — Cameroon
 Olios ituricus Strand, 1913 — Central Africa
 Olios jaenicke Jäger, 2012 — Laos
 Olios jaldaparaensis Saha & Raychaudhuri, 2007 — India
 Olios japonicus Jäger & Ono, 2000 — Japan (Ryukyu Is.)
 Olios kassenjicola Strand, 1916 — Central Africa
 Olios keyserlingi (Simon, 1880) — Brazil
 Olios kiranae Sethi & Tikader, 1988 — India
 Olios kruegeri (Simon, 1897) — South Africa
 Olios lacticolor Lawrence, 1952 — South Africa
 Olios lamarcki (Latreille, 1806) — Madagascar to India, Sri Lanka, Bangladesh
 Olios lamarcki taprobanicus Strand, 1913 — Sri Lanka
 Olios lepidus Vellard, 1924 — Brazil
 Olios longespinus Caporiacco, 1947 — East Africa
 Olios longipedatus Roewer, 1951 — Brazil
 Olios longipedes Roewer, 1951 — Sudan
 Olios lutescens (Thorell, 1894) — Pakistan, Myanmar, Indonesia (Sumatra, Java)
 Olios luteus (Keyserling, 1880) — Peru
 Olios machadoi Lawrence, 1952 — South Africa
 Olios macroepigynus Soares, 1944 — Brazil
 Olios maculatus (Blackwall, 1862) — Brazil, Caribbean?
 Olios maculinotatus Strand, 1909 — South Africa
 Olios mahabangkawitus Barrion & Litsinger, 1995 — Philippines
 Olios malagassus Strand, 1907 — Madagascar
 Olios malagassus septifer Strand, 1908 — Madagascar
 Olios marshalli (Pocock, 1898) — South Africa
 Olios mathani (Simon, 1880) — Peru, Brazil
 Olios menghaiensis (Wang & Zhang, 1990) — China
 Olios milleti (Pocock, 1901) — India, Sri Lanka
 Olios minensis (Mello-Leitão, 1917) — Brazil
 Olios monticola Berland, 1924 — New Caledonia
 Olios morbillosus (MacLeay, 1827) — Australia
 Olios mordax (O. Pickard-Cambridge, 1899) — Madagascar
 Olios muang Jäger & Praxaysombath, 2009 — Laos
 Olios mutabilis Mello-Leitão, 1917 — Brazil
 Olios mygalinus Doleschall, 1857 — Indonesia (Moluccas), New Guinea
 Olios mygalinus cinctipes Merian, 1911 — Indonesia (Sulawesi)
 Olios mygalinus nigripalpis Merian, 1911 — Indonesia (Sulawesi)
 Olios nanningensis (Hu & Ru, 1988) — China
 Olios neocaledonicus Berland, 1924 — New Caledonia
 Olios nigrifrons (Simon, 1897) — Indonesia (Java)
 Olios nigristernis (Simon, 1880) — Brazil
 Olios nigriventris Taczanowski, 1872 — French Guiana
 Olios nossibeensis Strand, 1907 — Madagascar
 Olios oberzelleri Kritscher, 1966 — New Caledonia
 Olios obesulus (Pocock, 1901) — India
 Olios obscurus (Keyserling, 1880) — Mexico, Costa Rica, Panama
 Olios obtusus (F. O. Pickard-Cambridge, 1900) — Guatemala
 Olios occidentalis (Karsch, 1879) — Congo
 Olios orchiticus Mello-Leitão, 1930 — Brazil
 Olios ornatus (Thorell, 1877) — Indonesia (Sulawesi)
 Olios oubatchensis Berland, 1924 — New Caledonia
 Olios paalongus Barrion & Litsinger, 1995 — Philippines
 Olios pacifer Lessert, 1921 — Congo, East Africa
 Olios paenuliformis Strand, 1916 — West Africa
 Olios pagurus Walckenaer, 1837 — Australia
 Olios paraensis (Keyserling, 1880) — Brazil
 Olios patagiatus (Simon, 1897) — India
 Olios pellucidus (Keyserling, 1880) — Peru
 Olios perezi Barrion & Litsinger, 1995 — Philippines
 Olios peruvianus Roewer, 1951 — Peru
 Olios phipsoni (Pocock, 1899) — India
 Olios pictitarsis (Simon, 1880) — Peru, Brazil
 Olios plumipes Mello-Leitão, 1937 — Brazil
 Olios praecinctus (L. Koch, 1865) — Australia (New South Wales)
 Olios princeps Hogg, 1914 — New Guinea
 Olios provocator Walckenaer, 1837 — South Africa
 Olios pulchripes (Thorell, 1899) — Cameroon
 Olios punctipes Simon, 1884 — India to Indonesia (Sumatra)
 Olios punctipes sordidatus (Thorell, 1895) — Myanmar
 Olios puniceus (Simon, 1880) — Peru, Brazil
 Olios punjabensis Dyal, 1935 — Pakistan
 Olios pusillus Simon, 1880 — Madagascar
 Olios pyrozonis (Pocock, 1901) — India
 Olios quesitio Moradmand, 2013 — Ethiopia
 Olios quinquelineatus Taczanowski, 1872 — French Guiana
 Olios roeweri Caporiacco, 1955 — Guyana
 Olios rosettii (Leardi, 1901) — India
 Olios rotundiceps (Pocock, 1901) — India
 Olios rubripes Taczanowski, 1872 — French Guiana
 Olios rubriventris (Thorell, 1881) — Indonesia (Moluccas), New Guinea
 Olios rufilatus (Pocock, 1900) — Cameroon, Congo
 Olios rufus (Keyserling, 1880) — Colombia
 Olios ruwenzoricus Strand, 1913 — Central Africa
 Olios sanctivincenti (Simon, 1898) — St. Vincent
 Olios sanguinifrons (Simon, 1906) — Pakistan, India
 Olios scalptor Jäger & Ono, 2001 — Taiwan
 Olios schonlandi (Pocock, 1900) — South Africa
 Olios senilis Simon, 1880 — India, Sri Lanka
 Olios sericeus (Kroneberg, 1875) — Georgia, Central Asia, Iran, Afghanistan
 Olios sexpunctatus Caporiacco, 1947 — Guyana
 Olios sherwoodi Lessert, 1929 — Congo
 Olios similaris (Rainbow, 1898) — New Guinea
 Olios similis (O. Pickard-Cambridge, 1890) — Guatemala
 Olios simoni (O. Pickard-Cambridge, 1890) — Guatemala
 Olios sjostedti Lessert, 1921 — Tanzania, Botswana, South Africa
 Olios skwarrae (Roewer, 1933) — Mexico
 Olios socotranus (Pocock, 1903) — Yemen (Socotra)
 Olios somalicus Caporiacco, 1940 — Somalia
 Olios soratensis Strand, 1907 — Bolivia
 Olios spenceri Pocock, 1896 — South Africa
 Olios spiculosus (Pocock, 1901) — South Africa
 Olios spinipalpis (Pocock, 1901) — Zimbabwe
 Olios stictopus (Pocock, 1898) — South Africa
 Olios stimulator (Simon, 1897) — India
 Olios strandi Kolosváry, 1934 — New Guinea
 Olios striatus (Blackwall, 1867) — India
 Olios stylifer (F. O. Pickard-Cambridge, 1900) — Mexico, Brazil
 Olios suavis (O. Pickard-Cambridge, 1876) — Cyprus, Israel, Egypt
 Olios subadultus Mello-Leitão, 1930 — Brazil
 Olios subpusillus Strand, 1907 — Madagascar
 Olios sulphuratus (Thorell, 1899) — Cameroon
 Olios suung Jäger, 2012 — Laos
 Olios sylvaticus (Blackwall, 1862) — Brazil
 Olios tamerlani Roewer, 1951 — New Guinea
 Olios tarandus (Simon, 1897) — India
 Olios tener (Thorell, 1891) — Pakistan, India, Myanmar
 Olios tiantongensis (Zhang & Kim, 1996) — China
 Olios tigrinus (Keyserling, 1880) — Peru
 Olios tikaderi Kundu, Biswas & Raychaudhuri, 1999 — India
 Olios timidus (O. Pickard-Cambridge, 1885) — China (Yarkand)
 Olios triarmatus Lessert, 1936 — Mozambique
 Olios trifurcatus (Pocock, 1900) — Cameroon
 Olios trinitatis Strand, 1916 — Trinidad
 Olios valenciae Strand, 1916 — Venezuela
 Olios variatus (Thorell, 1899) — Cameroon
 Olios velox (Simon, 1880) — Peru
 Olios ventrosus Nicolet, 1849 — Chile
 Olios vitiosus Vellard, 1924 — Brazil
 Olios vittifemur Strand, 1916 — Central Africa
 Olios werneri (Simon, 1906) — Sudan
 Olios wolfi Strand, 1911 — New Guinea
 Olios wroughtoni (Simon, 1897) — India
 Olios yucatanus Chamberlin, 1925 — Mexico
 Olios zebra (Thorell, 1881) — Indonesia (Moluccas)
 Olios zulu Simon, 1880 — South Africa

Orchestrella

Orchestrella Lawrence, 1965 - Incertae Sedis
 Orchestrella caroli Lawrence, 1966 — Namibia
 Orchestrella longipes Lawrence, 1965 (type) — Namibia

Origes

Origes Simon, 1897 - Incertae Sedis
 Origes chloroticus Mello-Leitão, 1945 — Argentina
 Origes nigrovittatus (Keyserling, 1880) — Peru
 Origes pollens Simon, 1897 (type) — Ecuador

P

Paenula

Paenula Simon, 1897 - Incertae Sedis
 Paenula paupercula Simon, 1897 (type) — Ecuador

Palystella

Palystella Lawrence, 1928 - Incertae Sedis
 Palystella browni Lawrence, 1962 — Namibia
 Palystella namaquensis Lawrence, 1938 — Namibia
 Palystella pallida Lawrence, 1938 — Namibia
 Palystella sexmaculata Lawrence, 1928 (type) — Namibia

Palystes

Palystes L. Koch, 1875 - Palystinae
 Palystes ansiedippenaarae Croeser, 1996 — South Africa
 Palystes castaneus (Latreille, 1819) (type) — South Africa
 Palystes convexus Strand, 1907 — Madagascar
 Palystes crawshayi Pocock, 1902 — Lesotho
 Palystes ellioti Pocock, 1896 — Central, East Africa
 Palystes flavidus Simon, 1897 — India
 Palystes fornasinii (Pavesi, 1881) — Mozambique
 Palystes hoehneli Simon, 1890 — Kenya, Tanzania
 Palystes johnstoni Pocock, 1896 — Botswana, Zimbabwe, Malawi, Mozambique, Uganda
 Palystes karooensis Croeser, 1996 — South Africa
 Palystes kreutzmanni Jäger & Kunz, 2010 — South Africa
 Palystes leppanae Pocock, 1902 — South Africa
 Palystes leroyorum Croeser, 1996 — South Africa
 Palystes lunatus Pocock, 1896 — South Africa
 Palystes martinfilmeri Croeser, 1996 — South Africa
 Palystes perornatus Pocock, 1900 — South Africa
 Palystes pinnotheres (Walckenaer, 1805) — Australia (New South Wales), New Caledonia
 Palystes reticulatus Rainbow, 1899 — Santa Cruz Is.
 Palystes spiralis Strand, 1907 — Madagascar
 Palystes stilleri Croeser, 1996 — South Africa
 Palystes stuarti Croeser, 1996 — South Africa
 Palystes superciliosus L. Koch, 1875 — Southern Africa

Panaretella

Panaretella Lawrence, 1937 - Palystinae
 Panaretella distincta (Pocock, 1896) (type) — South Africa
 Panaretella immaculata Lawrence, 1952 — South Africa
 Panaretella minor Lawrence, 1952 — South Africa
 Panaretella scutata (Pocock, 1902) — South Africa
 Panaretella zuluana Lawrence, 1937 — South Africa

Pandercetes

Pandercetes L. Koch, 1875 - Heteropodinae
 Pandercetes celatus Pocock, 1899 — India
 Pandercetes celebensis Merian, 1911 — Indonesia (Sulawesi)
 Pandercetes celebensis vulcanicola Merian, 1911 — Indonesia (Sulawesi)
 Pandercetes decipiens Pocock, 1899 — India, Sri Lanka
 Pandercetes gracilis L. Koch, 1875 (type) — Indonesia (Moluccas, Sulawesi), New Guinea, Australia (Queensland)
 Pandercetes isopus Thorell, 1881 — Indonesia (Moluccas), New Guinea
 Pandercetes longipes Thorell, 1881 — Papua New Guinea (Yule Is.)
 Pandercetes macilentus Thorell, 1895 — Myanmar
 Pandercetes malleator Thorell, 1890 — Malaysia, Indonesia (Aru Is.)
 Pandercetes manoius Roewer, 1938 — New Guinea
 Pandercetes niger Merian, 1911 — Indonesia (Sulawesi)
 Pandercetes nigrogularis (Simon, 1897) — Indonesia (Java)
 Pandercetes ochreus Hogg, 1922 — Vietnam
 Pandercetes palliventris Strand, 1911 — New Guinea
 Pandercetes peronianus (Walckenaer, 1837) — New Zealand
 Pandercetes plumipes (Doleschall, 1859) — Sri Lanka, Indonesia (Ambon), New Guinea
 Pandercetes plumosus Pocock, 1899 — Papua New Guinea (New Britain)

Parapalystes

Parapalystes Croeser, 1996 - Palystinae
 Parapalystes cultrifer (Pocock, 1900) — South Africa
 Parapalystes euphorbiae Croeser, 1996 (type) — South Africa
 Parapalystes lycosinus (Pocock, 1900) — South Africa
 Parapalystes megacephalus (C. L. Koch, 1845) — South Africa
 Parapalystes whiteae (Pocock, 1902) — South Africa

Pediana

Pediana Simon, 1880 - Deleninae
 Pediana aurochelis Strand, 1907 — Indonesia (Java)
 Pediana horni (Hogg, 1896) — Australia
 Pediana longbottomi Hirst, 1996 — Australia (Western Australia)
 Pediana mainae Hirst, 1995 — Australia (Northern Territory)
 Pediana occidentalis Hogg, 1903 — Australia (Western Australia, South Australia)
 Pediana paradoxa Hirst, 1996 — Australia (South Australia)
 Pediana regina (L. Koch, 1875) (type) — Australia (Western Australia, Queensland, New South Wales)
 Pediana regina isopedina Strand, 1913 — Central Australia
 Pediana temmei Hirst, 1996 — Australia (South Australia)
 Pediana tenuis Hogg, 1903 — Australia (Western Australia, South Australia)
 Pediana webberae Hirst, 1996 — Australia (Northern Territory)

Pleorotus

Pleorotus Simon, 1898 - Sparianthinae
 Pleorotus braueri Simon, 1898 (type) — Seychelles

Polybetes

Polybetes Simon, 1897 - Sparassinae
 Polybetes delfini Simon, 1904 — Chile
 Polybetes germaini Simon, 1897 — Brazil, Paraguay, Argentina
 Polybetes martius (Nicolet, 1849) (type) — Chile, Argentina
 Polybetes obnuptus Simon, 1897 — Bolivia, Argentina
 Polybetes pallidus Mello-Leitão, 1941 — Argentina
 Polybetes parvus (Järvi, 1914) — Paraguay
 Polybetes punctulatus Mello-Leitão, 1944 — Argentina
 Polybetes pythagoricus (Holmberg, 1875) — Brazil, Guyana, Uruguay, Paraguay, Argentina
 Polybetes quadrifoveatus (Järvi, 1914) — Argentina
 Polybetes rapidus (Keyserling, 1880) — Suriname to Argentina
 Polybetes rubrosignatus Mello-Leitão, 1943 — Brazil
 Polybetes trifoveatus (Järvi, 1914) — Paraguay, Argentina

Prusias

Prusias O. Pickard-Cambridge, 1892 - Incertae Sedis
 Prusias brasiliensis Mello-Leitão, 1915 — Brazil
 Prusias lanceolatus Simon, 1897 — Brazil or Peru
 Prusias nugalis O. Pickard-Cambridge, 1892 (type) — Mexico, Panama
 Prusias semotus (O. Pickard-Cambridge, 1892) — Panama

Prychia

Prychia L. Koch, 1875 - Incertae Sedis
 Prychia gracilis L. Koch, 1875 (type) — New Guinea to Fiji, Polynesia
 Prychia maculata Karsch, 1878 — New Guinea
 Prychia pallidula Strand, 1911 — New Guinea
 Prychia suavis Simon, 1897 — Philippines

Pseudomicrommata

Pseudomicrommata Järvi, 1914 - Incertae Sedis
 Pseudomicrommata longipes (Bösenberg & Lenz, 1895) (type) — Africa
 Pseudomicrommata mary Moradmand, 2015 — Guinea, Ivory Coast
 Pseudomicrommata schoemanae Moradmand, 2015 — Cameroon
 Pseudomicrommata vittigera (Simon, 1897) — Namibia, South Africa

Pseudopoda

Pseudopoda Jäger, 2000 - Heteropodinae
 Pseudopoda abnormis Jäger, 2001 — India
 Pseudopoda acuminata Zhang, Zhang & Zhang, 2013 — China
 Pseudopoda akashi (Sethi & Tikader, 1988) — India
 Pseudopoda albolineata Jäger, 2001 — Nepal
 Pseudopoda albonotata Jäger, 2001 — Bhutan
 Pseudopoda alta Jäger, 2001 — Nepal
 Pseudopoda amelia Jäger & Vedel, 2007 — China
 Pseudopoda anguilliformis Zhang, Jäger & Liu, 2017 — China
 Pseudopoda ashcharya Jäger & Kulkarni, 2016 — India
 Pseudopoda ausobskyi Jäger, 2001 — Nepal
 Pseudopoda bangaga Jäger, 2015 — Myanmar
 Pseudopoda biapicata Jäger, 2001 — Myanmar
 Pseudopoda bibulba (Xu & Yin, 2000) — China
 Pseudopoda bicruris Quan, Zhong & Liu, 2014 — China
 Pseudopoda birmanica Jäger, 2001 — Myanmar
 Pseudopoda brauni Jäger, 2001 — Nepal
 Pseudopoda breviducta Zhang, Zhang & Zhang, 2013 — China
 Pseudopoda cangschana Jäger & Vedel, 2007 — China
 Pseudopoda casaria (Simon, 1897) — India
 Pseudopoda chauki Jäger, 2001 — Nepal
 Pseudopoda chayuensis Zhao & Li, 2018 — China
 Pseudopoda cheppe Caleb, 2018 — India
 Pseudopoda chulingensis Jäger, 2001 — Nepal
 Pseudopoda coenobium Jäger, Li & Krehenwinkel, 2015 — China
 Pseudopoda colubrina Zhao & Li, 2018 — Myanmar
 Pseudopoda conaensis Zhao & Li, 2018 — China
 Pseudopoda confusa Jäger, Pathoumthong & Vedel, 2006 — Laos
 Pseudopoda contentio Jäger & Vedel, 2007 — China
 Pseudopoda contraria Jäger & Vedel, 2007 — China
 Pseudopoda cuneata Jäger, 2001 — Nepal
 Pseudopoda daliensis Jäger & Vedel, 2007 — China
 Pseudopoda dama Jäger, 2001 — Nepal
 Pseudopoda damana Jäger, 2001 — Nepal
 Pseudopoda dao Jäger, 2001 — Thailand
 Pseudopoda daxing Zhao & Li, 2018 — Myanmar
 Pseudopoda dhulensis Jäger, 2001 — Nepal
 Pseudopoda digitata Jäger & Vedel, 2007 — China
 Pseudopoda diversipunctata Jäger, 2001 — Nepal
 Pseudopoda emei Zhang, Zhang & Zhang, 2013 — China
 Pseudopoda everesta Jäger, 2001 — Nepal
 Pseudopoda exigua (Fox, 1938) — China
 Pseudopoda exiguoides (Song & Zhu, 1999) — China
 Pseudopoda fabularis Jäger, 2008 — India
 Pseudopoda fissa Jäger & Vedel, 2005 — Vietnam
 Pseudopoda gemina Jäger, Pathoumthong & Vedel, 2006 — Laos
 Pseudopoda gexiao Zhao & Li, 2018 — Myanmar
 Pseudopoda gibberosa Zhang, Zhang & Zhang, 2013 — China
 Pseudopoda gogona Jäger, 2001 — Bhutan
 Pseudopoda gongschana Jäger & Vedel, 2007 — China
 Pseudopoda grahami (Fox, 1936) — China
 Pseudopoda grasshoffi Jäger, 2001 — Nepal
 Pseudopoda heteropodoides Jäger, 2001 — Nepal
 Pseudopoda hingstoni Jäger, 2001 — India
 Pseudopoda hirsuta Jäger, 2001 — Thailand
 Pseudopoda huberi Jäger, 2015 — Myanmar
 Pseudopoda huberti Jäger, 2001 — Nepal
 Pseudopoda hyatti Jäger, 2001 — Nepal
 Pseudopoda intermedia Jäger, 2001 — Myanmar
 Pseudopoda interposita Jäger & Vedel, 2007 — China
 Pseudopoda jirensis Jäger, 2001 — Nepal
 Pseudopoda kalinchoka Jäger, 2001 — Nepal
 Pseudopoda kasariana Jäger & Ono, 2002 — Japan
 Pseudopoda khimtensis Jäger, 2001 — Nepal
 Pseudopoda kullmanni Jäger, 2001 — Myanmar, Indonesia (Sumatra)
 Pseudopoda kunmingensis Sun & Zhang, 2012 — China
 Pseudopoda lacrimosa Zhang, Zhang & Zhang, 2013 — China
 Pseudopoda latembola Jäger, 2001 — Nepal
 Pseudopoda lushanensis (Wang, 1990) — China
 Pseudopoda lutea (Thorell, 1895) — Myanmar
 Pseudopoda maeklongensis Zhao & Li, 2018 — Thailand
 Pseudopoda marmorea Jäger, 2001 — Nepal
 Pseudopoda marsupia (Wang, 1991) — China, Thailand
 Pseudopoda martensi Jäger, 2001 — Nepal
 Pseudopoda martinae Jäger, 2001 — Nepal
 Pseudopoda martinschuberti Jäger, 2015 — Myanmar
 Pseudopoda mediana Quan, Zhong & Liu, 2014 — China
 Pseudopoda medogensis Zhao & Li, 2018 — China
 Pseudopoda megalopora Jäger, 2001 — Myanmar
 Pseudopoda minor Jäger, 2001 — India
 Pseudopoda monticola Jäger, 2001 — Nepal
 Pseudopoda namkhan Jäger, Pathoumthong & Vedel, 2006 — China, Vietnam, Laos
 Pseudopoda nanyueensis Tang & Yin, 2000 — China
 Pseudopoda nyingchiensis Zhao & Li, 2018 — China
 Pseudopoda obtusa Jäger & Vedel, 2007 — China
 Pseudopoda ohne Logunov & Jäger, 2015 — Vietnam
 Pseudopoda parvipunctata Jäger, 2001 — Thailand
 Pseudopoda peronata Zhang, Jäger & Liu, 2017 — China
 Pseudopoda perplexa Jäger, 2008 — India
 Pseudopoda pingu Jäger, 2015 — Myanmar
 Pseudopoda platembola Jäger, 2001 — Myanmar
 Pseudopoda prompta (O. Pickard-Cambridge, 1885) (type) — Pakistan, India
 Pseudopoda putaoensis Zhao & Li, 2018 — Myanmar
 Pseudopoda recta Jäger & Ono, 2001 — Taiwan
 Pseudopoda rhopalocera Yang, Chen, Chen & Zhang, 2009 — China
 Pseudopoda rivicola Jäger & Vedel, 2007 — China
 Pseudopoda robusta Zhang, Zhang & Zhang, 2013 — China
 Pseudopoda roganda Jäger & Vedel, 2007 — China
 Pseudopoda rufosulphurea Jäger, 2001 — Thailand
 Pseudopoda saetosa Jäger & Vedel, 2007 — China
 Pseudopoda schawalleri Jäger, 2001 — Nepal
 Pseudopoda schwendingeri Jäger, 2001 — Thailand
 Pseudopoda semiannulata Zhang, Zhang & Zhang, 2013 — China
 Pseudopoda serrata Jäger & Ono, 2001 — Taiwan
 Pseudopoda shacunensis Zhao & Li, 2018 — China
 Pseudopoda shillongensis (Sethi & Tikader, 1988) — India
 Pseudopoda shuo Zhao & Li, 2018 — China
 Pseudopoda shuqiangi Jäger & Vedel, 2007 — China
 Pseudopoda sicca Jäger, 2008 — India
 Pseudopoda sicyoidea Zhang, Jäger & Liu, 2017 — China
 Pseudopoda signata Jäger, 2001 — China
 Pseudopoda sinapophysis Jäger & Vedel, 2007 — China
 Pseudopoda sinopodoides Jäger, 2001 — Nepal
 Pseudopoda songi Jäger, 2008 — China
 Pseudopoda spiculata (Wang, 1990) — China
 Pseudopoda spirembolus Jäger & Ono, 2002 — Japan
 Pseudopoda straminiosa (Kundu, Biswas & Raychaudhuri, 1999) — India
 Pseudopoda subbirmanica Zhao & Li, 2018 — Myanmar
 Pseudopoda taibaischana Jäger, 2001 — China
 Pseudopoda thorelli Jäger, 2001 — Myanmar
 Pseudopoda tiantangensis Quan, Zhong & Liu, 2014 — China
 Pseudopoda tinjura Jäger, 2001 — Nepal
 Pseudopoda titan Zhao & Li, 2018 — Myanmar
 Pseudopoda tji Jäger, 2015 — Myanmar
 Pseudopoda triangula Zhang, Zhang & Zhang, 2013 — China
 Pseudopoda triapicata Jäger, 2001 — Nepal
 Pseudopoda trisuliensis Jäger, 2001 — Nepal
 Pseudopoda varia Jäger, 2001 — Nepal
 Pseudopoda virgata (Fox, 1936) — China
 Pseudopoda wamwo Jäger, 2015 — Myanmar
 Pseudopoda wang Jäger & Praxaysombath, 2009 — Laos
 Pseudopoda wu Jäger, Li & Krehenwinkel, 2015 — China
 Pseudopoda xia Zhao & Li, 2018 — Myanmar
 Pseudopoda yinae Jäger & Vedel, 2007 — China
 Pseudopoda yuanjiangensis Zhao & Li, 2018 — China
 Pseudopoda yunnanensis (Yang & Hu, 2001) — China
 Pseudopoda zhangi Fu & Zhu, 2008 — China
 Pseudopoda zhangmuensis (Hu & Li, 1987) — China
 Pseudopoda zhejiangensis (Zhang & Kim, 1996) — China
 Pseudopoda zhenkangensis Yang, Chen, Chen & Zhang, 2009 — China
 Pseudopoda zixiensis Zhao & Li, 2018 — China

Pseudosparianthis

Pseudosparianthis Simon, 1887 - Sparianthinae
 Pseudosparianthis accentuata Caporiacco, 1955 — Venezuela
 Pseudosparianthis ambigua Caporiacco, 1938 — Guatemala
 Pseudosparianthis chickeringi (Gertsch, 1941) — Panama
 Pseudosparianthis fusca Simon, 1887 (type) — Brazil
 Pseudosparianthis jayuyae Petrunkevitch, 1930 — Puerto Rico
 Pseudosparianthis megalopalpa Caporiacco, 1954 — French Guiana
 † Pseudosparianthis pfeifferi Wunderlich, 1988 — Neogen Dominican amber 
Pseudosparianthis picta Simon, 1887 — Brazil, Guyana
 Pseudosparianthis ravida Simon, 1898 — St. Vincent

Q

Quemedice

Quemedice Mello-Leitão, 1942 - Sparassinae
 Quemedice enigmaticus Mello-Leitão, 1942 (type) — Brazil, Argentina
 Quemedice piracuruca Rheims, Labarque & Ramírez, 2008 — Colombia, Brazil

R

Remmius

Remmius Simon, 1897 - Incertae Sedis
 Remmius badius Roewer, 1961 — Senegal
 Remmius praecalvus Simon, 1910 — Congo
 Remmius quadridentatus Simon, 1903 — Equatorial Guinea
 Remmius vulpinus Simon, 1897 — Cameroon, Congo
 Remmius vultuosus Simon, 1897 (type) — Cameroon, Congo

Rhacocnemis

Rhacocnemis Simon, 1897 - Sparianthinae
 Rhacocnemis guttatus (Blackwall, 1877) (type) — Seychelles

Rhitymna

Rhitymna Simon, 1897 - Incertae Sedis
 Rhitymna ambae Jäger, 2003 — Indonesia (Java)
 Rhitymna bicolana (Barrion & Litsinger, 1995) — Philippines
 Rhitymna cursor (Thorell, 1894) — Singapore, Indonesia (Java)
 Rhitymna deelemanae Jäger, 2003 — Indonesia (Bali, Sumba)
 Rhitymna flava Schmidt & Krause, 1994 — Comoros
 Rhitymna flores Jäger, 2019 — Indonesia (Flores)
 Rhitymna gerdmangel Jäger, 2019 — Thailand, Malaysia
 Rhitymna hildebrandti Järvi, 1914 — Madagascar
 Rhitymna imerinensis (Vinson, 1863) — Madagascar
 Rhitymna kananggar Jäger, 2003 — Indonesia (Sumba)
 Rhitymna macilenta Quan & Liu, 2012 — China (Hainan)
 Rhitymna merianae Jäger, 2019 — Indonesia (Bali)
 Rhitymna occidentalis Jäger, 2003 — Sri Lanka
 Rhitymna pinangensis (Thorell, 1891) (type) — Thailand, Malaysia, Indonesia (Sumatra, Borneo, Java)
 Rhitymna plana Jäger, 2003 — Laos, Vietnam, Cambodia
 Rhitymna pseudokumanga (Barrion & Litsinger, 1995) — Philippines
 Rhitymna saccata Järvi, 1914 — East Africa
 Rhitymna senckenbergi Jäger, 2019 — Philippines (Negros)
 Rhitymna simplex Jäger, 2003 — Malaysia (Borneo)
 Rhitymna tangi Quan & Liu, 2012 — China (Hainan), Laos
 Rhitymna tuhodnigra (Barrion & Litsinger, 1995) — Philippines
 Rhitymna verruca (Wang, 1991) — China, Laos, Vietnam, Thailand
 Rhitymna xanthopus Simon, 1901 — Malaysia

S

Sagellula

Sagellula Strand, 1942 - Incertae Sedis
 Sagellula octomunita (Dönitz & Strand, 1906) (type) — Japan
 Sagellula xizangensis (Hu, 2001) — China

Sampaiosia

Sampaiosia Mello-Leitão, 1930 - Incertae Sedis
 Sampaiosia crulsi Mello-Leitão, 1930 (type) — Brazil

Sarotesius

Sarotesius Pocock, 1898 - Palystinae
 Sarotesius melanognathus Pocock, 1898 (type) — East Africa

Sinopoda

Sinopoda Jäger, 1999 - Heteropodinae
 Sinopoda afflata Zhong, Cao & Liu, 2017 — China
 Sinopoda albofasciata Jäger & Ono, 2002 — Japan (Ryukyu Is.)
 Sinopoda altissima (Hu & Li, 1987) — China
 Sinopoda anguina Liu, Li & Jäger, 2008 — China
 Sinopoda angulata Jäger, Gao & Fei, 2002 — China
 Sinopoda aureola Kim, Lee & Lee, 2014 — Korea
 Sinopoda biguttata Lee, Lee & Kim, 2016 — Korea
 Sinopoda campanacea (Wang, 1990) — China
 Sinopoda chongan Xu, Yin & Peng, 2000 — China
 Sinopoda cochlearia Zhang, Zhang & Zhang, 2015 — China
 Sinopoda crassa Liu, Li & Jäger, 2008 — China
 Sinopoda dasani Kim, Lee, Lee & Hong, 2015 — Korea
 Sinopoda dashahe Zhu, Zhang, Zhang & Chen, 2005 — China
 Sinopoda dayong (Bao, Yin & Yan, 2000) — China
 Sinopoda derivata Jäger & Ono, 2002 — Japan
 Sinopoda exspectata Jäger & Ono, 2001 — Taiwan
 Sinopoda fasciculata Jäger, Gao & Fei, 2002 — China
 Sinopoda forcipata (Karsch, 1881) (type) — China, Korea, Japan
 Sinopoda fornicata Liu, Li & Jäger, 2008 — China
 Sinopoda globosa Zhang, Zhang & Zhang, 2015 — China
 Sinopoda grandispinosa Liu, Li & Jäger, 2008 — China
 Sinopoda guangyuanensis Zhong, Jäger, Chen & Liu, 2018 — China
 Sinopoda guap Jäger, 2012 — Laos
 Sinopoda hamata (Fox, 1937) — China
 Sinopoda himalayica (Hu & Li, 1987) — China
 Sinopoda horizontalis Zhong, Cao & Liu, 2017 — China
 Sinopoda koreana (Paik, 1968) — Korea, Japan
 Sinopoda licenti (Schenkel, 1953) — China
 Sinopoda liui Zhong, Cao & Liu, 2017 — China
 Sinopoda longiducta Zhang, Zhang & Zhang, 2015 — China
 Sinopoda longshan Yin, Peng, Yan & Bao, 2000 — China
 Sinopoda mamillata Zhong, Cao & Liu, 2017 — China
 Sinopoda mi Chen & Zhu, 2009 — China
 Sinopoda microphthalma (Fage, 1929) — Malaysia
 Sinopoda minschana (Schenkel, 1936) — China
 Sinopoda nigrobrunnea Lee, Lee & Kim, 2016 — Korea
 Sinopoda nuda Liu, Li & Jäger, 2008 — China
 Sinopoda ogatai Jäger & Ono, 2002 — Japan
 Sinopoda okinawana Jäger & Ono, 2000 — Japan (Ryukyu Is.)
 Sinopoda peet Jäger, 2012 — Laos
 Sinopoda pengi Song & Zhu, 1999 — China
 Sinopoda scurion Jäger, 2012 — Laos
 Sinopoda semicirculata Liu, Li & Jäger, 2008 — China
 Sinopoda separata Zhong, Cao & Liu, 2017 — China
 Sinopoda serpentembolus Zhang, Zhu, Jäger & Song, 2007 — China
 Sinopoda serrata (Wang, 1990) — China
 Sinopoda shennonga (Peng, Yin & Kim, 1996) — China
 Sinopoda sitkao Jäger, 2012 — Laos
 Sinopoda soong Jäger, 2012 — Laos
 Sinopoda steineri Jäger, 2012 — Laos
 Sinopoda stellata (Schenkel, 1963) — China
 Sinopoda stellatops Jäger & Ono, 2002 — Korea, Japan
 Sinopoda suang Jäger, 2012 — Laos
 Sinopoda taa Jäger, 2012 — Laos
 Sinopoda tanikawai Jäger & Ono, 2000 — Japan
 Sinopoda tengchongensis Fu & Zhu, 2008 — China
 Sinopoda tham Jäger, 2012 — Laos
 Sinopoda triangula Liu, Li & Jäger, 2008 — China
 Sinopoda undata Liu, Li & Jäger, 2008 — China
 Sinopoda wangi Song & Zhu, 1999 — China
 Sinopoda xieae Peng & Yin, 2001 — China
 Sinopoda yaojingensis Liu, Li & Jäger, 2008 — China

Sivalicus

Sivalicus Dyal, 1957 - Incertae Sedis
 Sivalicus viridis Dyal, 1957 (type) — India

Sparianthina

Sparianthina Banks, 1929 - Incertae Sedis
 Sparianthina adisi Jäger, Rheims & Labarque, 2009 — Venezuela
 Sparianthina deltshevi Jäger, Rheims & Labarque, 2009 — Venezuela
 Sparianthina gaita Rheims, 2011 — Venezuela
 Sparianthina milleri (Caporiacco, 1955) — Venezuela
 Sparianthina parang Rheims, 2011 — Tobago
 Sparianthina pumilla (Keyserling, 1880) — Colombia
 Sparianthina rufescens (Mello-Leitão, 1940) — Guyana
 Sparianthina saaristoi Jäger, Rheims & Labarque, 2009 — Venezuela
 Sparianthina selenopoides Banks, 1929 (type) — Costa Rica, Panama

Sparianthis

Sparianthis Simon, 1880 - Sparianthinae
 Sparianthis granadensis (Keyserling, 1880) (type) — Colombia

Spariolenus

Spariolenus Simon, 1880 - Heteropodinae
 Spariolenus aratta Moradmand & Jäger, 2011 — Iran
 Spariolenus buxa (Saha, Biswas & Raychaudhuri, 1995) — India
 Spariolenus fathpouri Moradmand, 2017 — Iran
 Spariolenus hormozii Moradmand, 2017 — Iran
 Spariolenus iranomaximus Moradmand & Jäger, 2011 — Iran
 Spariolenus khoozestanus Zamani, 2016 — Iran
 Spariolenus manesht Moradmand & Jäger, 2011 — Iran
 Spariolenus mansourii Moradmand, 2017 — Iran
 Spariolenus secundus Jäger, 2006 — Oman
 Spariolenus taeniatus Thorell, 1890 — Indonesia (Sumatra)
 Spariolenus taprobanicus (Walckenaer, 1837) — Sri Lanka
 Spariolenus tigris Simon, 1880 (type) — India, Pakistan, Malaysia
 Spariolenus zagros Moradmand & Jäger, 2011 — Iran

Staianus

Staianus Simon, 1889 - Incertae Sedis
 Staianus acuminatus Simon, 1889 (type) — Madagascar

Stasina

Stasina Simon, 1877 - Sparianthinae
 Stasina americana Simon, 1887 — Brazil
 Stasina hirticeps Caporiacco, 1955 — Venezuela
 Stasina manicata Simon, 1897 — Gabon
 Stasina nalandica Karsch, 1892 — Sri Lanka
 Stasina paripes (Karsch, 1879) — Sri Lanka
 Stasina planithorax Simon, 1897 — Malaysia
 Stasina rangelensis Franganillo, 1935 — Cuba
 Stasina spinosa Simon, 1897 — Brazil
 Stasina vittata Simon, 1877 (type) — Philippines

Stasinoides

Stasinoides Berland, 1922 - Incertae Sedis
 Stasinoides aethiopica Berland, 1922 (type) — Ethiopia

Stipax

Stipax Simon, 1898 - Sparianthinae
 Stipax triangulifer Simon, 1898 (type) — Seychelles

Strandiellum

Strandiellum Kolosváry, 1934 - Incertae Sedis
 Strandiellum wilhelmshafeni Kolosváry, 1934 (type) — New Guinea

T

Thelcticopis

Thelcticopis Karsch, 1884 - Sparianthinae
 Thelcticopis ajax Pocock, 1901 — India
 Thelcticopis ancorum Dyal, 1935 — Pakistan
 Thelcticopis bicornuta Pocock, 1901 — India
 Thelcticopis bifasciata (Thorell, 1891) — India (Nicobar Is.)
 Thelcticopis biroi Kolosváry, 1934 — New Guinea
 Thelcticopis buu Logunov & Jäger, 2015 — Vietnam
 Thelcticopis canescens Simon, 1887 — India (Andaman Is.), Myanmar
 Thelcticopis celebesiana Merian, 1911 — Indonesia (Sulawesi)
 Thelcticopis convoluticola Strand, 1911 — Indonesia (Aru Is.)
 Thelcticopis cuneisignata Chrysanthus, 1965 — New Guinea
 Thelcticopis fasciata (Thorell, 1897) — Myanmar
 Thelcticopis flavipes Pocock, 1897 — Indonesia (Moluccas)
 Thelcticopis folia Jäger & Praxaysombath, 2009 — Laos
 Thelcticopis goramensis (Thorell, 1881) — Malaysia
 Thelcticopis hercules Pocock, 1901 — Sri Lanka
 Thelcticopis humilithorax (Simon, 1910) — Congo
 Thelcticopis huyoplata Barrion & Litsinger, 1995 — Philippines
 Thelcticopis insularis (Karsch, 1881) — Micronesia
 Thelcticopis kaparanganensis Barrion & Litsinger, 1995 — Philippines
 Thelcticopis karnyi Reimoser, 1929 — Indonesia (Sumatra)
 Thelcticopis kianganensis Barrion & Litsinger, 1995 — Philippines
 Thelcticopis kirankhalapi Ahmed, Sumukha, Khalap, Mohan & Jadhav, 2015 — India
 Thelcticopis klossi Reimoser, 1929 — Indonesia (Sumatra)
 Thelcticopis luctuosa (Doleschall, 1859) — Indonesia (Java)
 Thelcticopis maindroni Simon, 1906 — India
 Thelcticopis modesta Thorell, 1890 — Malaysia
 Thelcticopis moesta (Doleschall, 1859) — Indonesia (Ambon)
 Thelcticopis moolampilliensis Sunil Jose & Sebastian, 2007 — India
 Thelcticopis nigrocephala Merian, 1911 — Indonesia (Sulawesi)
 Thelcticopis ochracea Pocock, 1899 — Papua New Guinea (New Britain)
 Thelcticopis orichalcea (Simon, 1880) — Indonesia (Sumatra, Borneo)
 Thelcticopis papuana (Simon, 1880) — New Guinea
 Thelcticopis pennata (Simon, 1901) — Malaysia
 Thelcticopis picta (Thorell, 1887) — Myanmar
 Thelcticopis quadrimunita (Strand, 1911) — New Guinea
 Thelcticopis rubristernis Strand, 1911 — Indonesia (Aru Is.)
 Thelcticopis rufula Pocock, 1901 — India
 Thelcticopis sagittata (Hogg, 1915) — New Guinea
 Thelcticopis salomonum (Strand, 1913) — Solomon Is.
 Thelcticopis scaura (Simon, 1910) — São Tomé and Príncipe
 Thelcticopis serambiformis Strand, 1907 — India
 Thelcticopis severa (L. Koch, 1875) (type) — China, Laos, Korea, Japan
 Thelcticopis simplerta Barrion & Litsinger, 1995 — Philippines
 Thelcticopis telonotata Dyal, 1935 — Pakistan
 Thelcticopis truculenta Karsch, 1884 — São Tomé and Príncipe
 Thelcticopis vasta (L. Koch, 1873) — Fiji
 Thelcticopis virescens Pocock, 1901 — India
 Thelcticopis zhengi Liu, Li & Jäger, 2010 — China

Thomasettia

Thomasettia Hirst, 1911 -Sparianthinae
 Thomasettia seychellana Hirst, 1911 (type) — Seychelles

Thunberga

Thunberga Jäger, 2020 - Heteropodinae
 Thunberga greta Jäger, 2020 — Madagascar
 Thunberga malagassa Strand, 1907 — Madagascar
 Thunberga nossibeensis Strand, 1907 (type) — Madagascar
 Thunberga septifer Strand, 1908 — Madagascar

Tibellomma

Tibellomma Simon, 1903 - Incertae Sedis
 Tibellomma chazaliae (Simon, 1898) (type) — Venezuela

Tychicus

Tychicus Simon, 1880 - Incertae Sedis
 Tychicus erythrophthalmus Simon, 1897 — Philippines
 Tychicus gaymardi Simon, 1880 — Papua New Guinea (Bismarck Arch.)
 Tychicus genitalis Strand, 1911 — New Guinea
 Tychicus longipes (Walckenaer, 1837) (type) — Indonesia (Ambon)
 Tychicus rufoides Strand, 1911 — Admiralty Is.

Typostola

Typostola Simon, 1897 - Deleninae
 Typostola barbata (L. Koch, 1875) (type) — Australia (Queensland)
 Typostola heterochroma Hirst, 1999 — Australia (Queensland, New South Wales)
 Typostola pilbara Hirst, 1999 — Australia (Western Australia)
 Typostola tari Hirst, 1999 — New Guinea

U

Uaiuara

Uaiuara Rheims, 2013 - Incertae Sedis
 Uaiuara amazonica (Simon, 1880) (type) — Northern South America
 Uaiuara barroana (Chamberlin, 1925) — Panama
 Uaiuara dianae Rheims, 2013 — Peru
 Uaiuara jirau Rheims, 2013 — Brazil
 Uaiuara ope Rheims, 2013 — Peru, Brazil
 Uaiuara palenque Rheims, 2013 — Ecuador
 Uaiuara quyguaba Rheims, 2013 — Brazil

V

Vindullus

Vindullus Simon, 1880 - Sparassinae
 Vindullus angulatus Rheims & Jäger, 2008 — Peru, Ecuador, Brazil
 Vindullus concavus Rheims & Jäger, 2008 — Brazil
 Vindullus fugiens (O. Pickard-Cambridge, 1890) — Guatemala
 Vindullus gibbosus Rheims & Jäger, 2008 — Peru, Suriname
 Vindullus gracilipes (Taczanowski, 1872) (type) — French Guiana, Brazil
 Vindullus guatemalensis (Keyserling, 1887) — Guatemala
 Vindullus kratochvili Caporiacco, 1955 — Venezuela
 Vindullus undulatus Rheims & Jäger, 2008 — Colombia, Venezuela

Y

Yiinthi

Yiinthi Davies, 1994 - Heteropodinae
 Yiinthi anzsesorum Davies, 1994 — Australia (Queensland)
 Yiinthi chillagoe Davies, 1994 — Australia (Queensland)
 Yiinthi gallonae Davies, 1994 — Australia (Queensland)
 Yiinthi kakadu Davies, 1994 — Australia (Western Australia, Northern Territory)
 Yiinthi lycodes (Thorell, 1881) — New Guinea, Australia (Queensland)
 Yiinthi molloyensis Davies, 1994 — Australia (Queensland)
 Yiinthi spathula Davies, 1994 (type) — Australia (Queensland)
 Yiinthi torresiana Davies, 1994 — Australia (Queensland)

Z

Zachria

Zachria L. Koch, 1875 - Deleninae
 † Zachria desiderabilis Petrunkevitch, 1950 — Palaeogen Baltic amber 
 Zachria flavicoma L. Koch, 1875 (type) — Australia (Western Australia)
 Zachria oblonga L. Koch, 1875 — Australia (New South Wales)
 † Zachria peculiata Petrunkevitch, 1946 — Palaeogen Baltic amber
 † Zachria restincta Petrunkevitch, 1958 — Palaeogen Baltic amber

References

Sparassidae
Sparassidae